Geoffrey Miller may refer to:

Geoffrey P. Miller, American professor of law, see List of law clerks of the Supreme Court of the United States
Geoffrey D. Miller (born 1949), US Army Major General
Geoffrey Miller (psychologist) (born 1965), evolutionary psychologist
Geoff Miller (born 1952), English cricketer
Geoff Miller (diplomat) (born 193?), former Australian public servant and diplomat
Geoff Miller (public servant) (1942–2014), former Australian public servant
Geoff Miller (priest) (born 1956), Archdeacon of Northumberland 
Geoffrey Miller (cricketer, born 1937), former English cricketer

See also
Jeffrey Miller (disambiguation)
Jeff Miller (disambiguation)
Geoff Millar (born 1955), former Australian cricketer